Kadalundi River (Kadalundipuzha) is one of the four major rivers flowing through Malappuram district in the Indian state of Kerala. The other three are the Chaliyar, the Bharathappuzha and the Tirur River. Kadalundi River is also the sixth longest River in Kerala. Kadalundi River passes through [Karuvarakundu, Tuvvur [Melattur, Kerala|Melattur]], Pandikkad, Manjeri, Malappuram, Panakkad, Parappur, Vengara, Tirurangadi, Parappanangadi, Vallikkunnu, and empties itself into Arabian sea at Kadalundi Nagaram in Vallikkunnu on the northwestern border of the district. It is formed by the confluence of the Olippuzha River and the Veliyar River. The Kadalundi originates from the Western Ghats at the western border of the Silent Valley and flows through the district of Malappuram. It has two main tributaries namely Olipuzha and Veliyar. Olipuzha and Veliyar merges together to become Kadalundi River near Melattur. Kadalundi River traverses through the historical regions of Eranad and Valluvanad. The Kadalundi River drains an area of 1274 km² and has a length of 120 km. The ancient port of Tyndis, which was the second-largest trading port of Chera dynasty, only after to Muziris, is identified with the mouth of this river at Vallikunnu. The Kadalundi Bird Sanctuary spreads over a cluster of islands where the Kadalundipuzha River flows into the Arabian Sea. There are over a hundred species of native birds  and around 60 species of migratory birds in large numbers annually.

Cultural Significance

The 16th century Malayalam poet and the author of Jnanappana, Poonthanam Nambudiri was born at Keezhattur near Perinthalmanna, on the bank of Kadalundi River.

Kerala Varma Valiya Koyi Thampuran (Kerala Kalidasan), Raja Raja Varma (Kerala Panini) and Raja Ravi Varma (Famous Painter) were from different branches of Parappanad Royal Family who migrated from Parappanangadi to Harippad, Changanassery, Mavelikkara and Kilimanoor. Parappanangadi also lies on the bank of Kadalundi River. The Chief Editor of the daily "The Hindu" (1898 to 1905) and Founder Chief Editor of "The Indian Patriot" Divan Bahadur Cozhisseri Karunakara Menon (1863–1922) was also from Parappanangadi. O. Chandu Menon wrote his novels "Indulekha" and "Saradha" while he was the judge at Parappanangadi Munciff Court. Indulekha is also the first Major Novel written in Malayalam language.

Villages
 

 Mudikkode (Malappuram)
 Vallikkunnu

See also
 Kadalundi Bird Sanctuary
 Kadalundi train derailment

References

External links

Rivers of Malappuram district